Xanthorhamnin is a chemical compound. It can be isolated from buckthorn berries (Rhamnus catharticus).

The aglycone of xanthorhamnin is rhamnetin.

References 

O-methylated flavonols
Flavonol glycosides